Cosmosoma flavitarsis is a moth of the family Erebidae. It was described by Francis Walker in 1854. It is found in Colombia and Venezuela.

References

flavitarsis
Moths described in 1854